Felipe Amadeo Flores Espinosa (born 5 February 1947) is a Mexican politician from the Institutional Revolutionary Party. He has served as Deputy of the LVI and LXI Legislatures of the Mexican Congress representing Veracruz.

References

1947 births
Living people
Politicians from Veracruz
Institutional Revolutionary Party politicians
21st-century Mexican politicians
Universidad Veracruzana alumni
Academic staff of Universidad Veracruzana
Members of the Congress of Veracruz
Deputies of the LXI Legislature of Mexico
Members of the Chamber of Deputies (Mexico) for Veracruz